LGT may refer to:
 LGT Group, private banking and asset management company 
 Locomotiv GT, a Hungarian rock band
 Lateral gene transfer
 Last Generation Theology
 ICAO airline code of Longtail Aviation